Nicolas Belvito (born 18 December 1986) is a French professional footballer who plays as a forward for Championnat National 2 club Limonest.

Career
On 24 June 2019, Belvito joined Monts d'Or Azergues (renamed GOAL FC).

Honours 
Red Star
 Championnat National: 2014–15

Notes

References

External links
 Nicolas Belvito at Foot-National.com
 
 
 
 
 

1986 births
People from Tassin-la-Demi-Lune
Living people
French footballers
Association football forwards
Football Bourg-en-Bresse Péronnas 01 players
USC Corte players
AS Saint-Priest players
Lyon La Duchère players
Dijon FCO players
RC Strasbourg Alsace players
AS Cherbourg Football players
US Orléans players
US Créteil-Lusitanos players
Red Star F.C. players
Ligue 2 players
Championnat National players
Championnat National 2 players
Ain Sud players
SR Colmar players
Grenoble Foot 38 players
GOAL FC players
FC Limonest Dardilly Saint-Didier players
Sportspeople from Lyon Metropolis
Footballers from Auvergne-Rhône-Alpes